Freedomland may refer to:

 Freedomland U.S.A., a short-lived themed amusement park in the Baychester section of the Bronx, New York City
 Freedomland (novel), a 1998 novel by Richard Price
 Freedomland (film), a 2006 film adaptation of Price's novel starring Samuel L. Jackson and Julianne Moore
 Freedomland, a play by Amy Freed
Free Territory of Freedomland, a micronation declared by Filipino explorer Tomás Cloma in the Spratly Islands